The 2016 Big South Conference women's soccer tournament is the postseason women's soccer tournament for the Big South Conference to be held from October 28 to November 6, 2016. The seven match tournament will be held at campus sites, with the semifinals and final held at Bryan Park in Greensboro, North Carolina. The eight team single-elimination tournament will consist of three rounds based on seeding from regular season conference play. The Liberty Flames are the defending tournament champions, after defeating the Campbell Lady Camels in the championship match.

Bracket

Schedule

Quarterfinals

Semifinals

Final

See also 
 Big South Conference
 2016 Big South Conference women's soccer season
 2016 NCAA Division I women's soccer season
 2016 NCAA Division I Women's Soccer Tournament

References 

2016 Big South Conference women's soccer season
Big South Conference Women's Soccer Tournament